Aaron Speiser (born, 22 September 1950) is an American acting coach and film director based in Los Angeles, California. He is the founder of the Speiser/Sturges Acting Studio, formerly known as Aaron Speiser Acting Studio, an acting school based in Los Angeles, California. Speiser has coached some of the most notable individuals in film and television industry including Academy Award winner Will Smith, Academy Award nominee Virginia Madsen, and Jennifer Lopez. He is currently the co-owner and partner with Kay Aston at The Screen Acting Studio in Los Angeles, California.

Biography
Speiser was born in 1950, in Manhattan, New York, to Pola and Julius Speiser and was raised in the Bronx. His parents were the holocaust survivors who were of Polish descent. Speiser attended Brandeis University where he received an MFA degree in acting. Later, he attended  HB Studio in New York City where he studied with Uta Hagen, Bill Hickey and his mentor Kenneth McMillan. He worked professionally in theatre, film and television for 15 years before fully committing to teaching.

Speiser’s coaching technique is recognized for its frank honesty, practical approach and personal connection to the character and the story. He is known for focusing specifically on the nuances of performing for the camera in the 21st century. He is the longtime preferred coach for Will Smith, Virginia Madsen, and Jennifer Lopez. He has also taught or coached several other prominent film and television artists including Martin Lawrence, Heather Graham, Karyn Parsons, Kevin Ryan, Lauris Reiniks, Jeff Dunham, Gerard Butler, Elijah Kelley, Hrithik Roshan and many more. Speiser has also worked on the sets with several acclaimed directors and producers such as Michael Mann, Oliver Stone, F. Gary Gray, Peter Berg, Ang Lee, Reinaldo Green, Antoine Fuqua, Tim White, Trevor White and Barry Sonnenfeld. He has been credited with on-set coaching in the making of various films such as Hustlers, King Richard, Out of Sight, I Am Legend, Hancock, Olympus Has Fallen and The Pursuit of Happyness.

In 1994, Speiser directed the feature film, Talking About Sex, starring Kim Wayans, which he also co-wrote and produced. The film received accolades at Palm Springs International Film Festival, and won the Best Film Award at Breckenridge Film Festival. Aaron also directed two episodes of The Wayans Brothers, “The Son of Marlon” (season 4, ep.13), and “Pops Gets Evicted” (season 5, ep. 16).

Credits

References

External links 
Official Website
Aaron Speiser at IMDB

American acting coaches
People from the Bronx
Brandeis University alumni
American film directors
1950 births
Living people